Tapinoma electrinum is an extinct species of ant in the genus Tapinoma. Described by Dlussky in 2002, fossils of the species were found in the Rovno amber in Ukraine, where a fossilised male of the species was described.

References

†
Fossil ant taxa
Hymenoptera of Europe
Prehistoric life of Europe
Fossil taxa described in 2002
Rovno amber